"¿Qué Nos Pasó?" ("What happened to us?") is a Latin pop song written by Puerto Rican artist Kany García from her debut album Cualquier Día. The song is the second single of her album Cualquier Día. It was released to radio in October 2007. It has since become a Top 30 Hit on Billboard Latin Pop Airplay.

Song information 
The song according to Kany, is a melancholy lament on a loveless world, the changes in the world, how people  acted before and how they act now. Kany has stated in many interviews that ¿Qué Nos Pasó? is for those people who are part of the materialistic world society, who have forgotten to love the really important things in life.

Music video
The music video was shot in a form of a live performance. Kany starts performing with her band in front of a couple of people. The video was shot in Mexico City and was directed by Alexis Gudino.

Track listing
"¿Qué Nos Pasó?": 3:24 (album version)
"¿Qué Nos Pasó?": 2:58 (radio version)

Chart performance
The song become a moderate success in Billboard Latin Pop Airplay charts peaking at #22.

Charts

Awards and nominations

References

External links
"¿Qué Nos Pasó?" music video on YouTube.com

2007 singles
Kany García songs
Songs written by Kany García
2006 songs